Confident is the fifth studio album by American singer Demi Lovato. It was released on October 16, 2015, by Hollywood, Island and Safehouse Records. The album features guest appearances from Australian rapper Iggy Azalea and American rapper Sirah. While Lovato co-wrote most of the songs on the album, she worked with writers and producers such as Max Martin, Ryan Tedder, Steve Mac, Rami and Stargate, among others. Musically, Confident is primarily a pop, dance and electropop record with influences of R&B, soul, EDM and urban.

Confident received generally positive reviews from music critics, with many praising its themes. Its lead single, "Cool for the Summer", was released on July 1, 2015, peaking at number 11 on the US Billboard Hot 100 and being certified 2× Platinum by RIAA. The second single, "Confident", premiered on September 18, 2015, and peaked at number 21 on the Hot 100 and was certified 3× Platinum by RIAA. The third and final single, "Stone Cold", peaked at number 2 on the Bubbling Under Hot 100 and was certified Platinum by the RIAA. Following its release, the album debuted at number one in Canada, while reaching the top 10 in fifteen other countries, including the United Kingdom and the United States. The album was further promoted with a concert tour co-headlined with Nick Jonas, entitled the Future Now Tour.

Confident was nominated for Best Pop Vocal Album at the 59th Annual Grammy Awards, marking Lovato's first career Grammy nomination.

Background and development
After releasing her fourth studio album Demi in May 2013, Lovato confirmed in February 2014 that she was working on her fifth studio effort, stating, "The sound just evolves into everything that I've been and everything that I want to become." Lovato also said, "I've never been so sure of myself as an artist when it comes down to confidence, but not only personal things, but exactly what I want my sound to be and what I know I'm capable of and this album will give me the opportunity to show people what I can really do." The following October, Lovato's then-manager confirmed to Billboard that she had "done some songs, but certainly the majority of it will kick off next year", following her Demi World Tour.

In February 2015, Lovato teased the album with a number of posts on Twitter, writing: "I've never been more confident in my sound. Never been so sure of who I am as an artist. Never felt this hungry and driven." Lovato further described the album as "very authentic to who I am". In June 2015, Lovato confirmed that she had been in the studio almost every day and would be releasing new music "very soon". Lovato revealed to MTV News: "This time around, I was able to explore different sounds, and hone in [sic] on something that I'm really proud of." Lovato also expressed wishes to work with rapper Iggy Azalea on the album.

Recording and production
For Confident, Lovato worked with music producers such as Max Martin, Ilya Salmanzadeh, Ali Payami, Jason Evigan, Johan Carlsson, Steve Mac, Stargate, Carl Falk, Rami Yacoub, Babydaddy and Peter Carlsson. Discussing the album's direction, Lovato told Ryan Seacrest that "I'm no longer serious", stating: "I'm done with the sob stories. New chapter, new life, new album, new single — this is a completely new Demi." She also revealed that it would feature "a lot of provocative songs". The first songs "Confident" and "Cool for the Summer" among with "Stars" and "Mr. Hughes" were recorded at MXM Studios, Chalice Studios, Westlake Audio Studios in Los Angeles, California and Wolf Cousins Studios and Kinglet Studios in Stockholm. Lovato co-wrote both tracks with Martin, Kotecha, Alexander Erik, Payami and Salmazadeh. The horn arrangement from "Confident" was provided by musician Jonas Thander. The songs were both mixed by Serban Ghenea and mastered by Tom Coyne. Others songs of the album also were recorded at Rokstone Studios and The Hide Out Studios in London, United Kingdom. "For You" was one of the first songs recorded for the album, describing how it was working with the producer Max Martin in the song's production, Lovato revealed, "I was just so excited to get to work with Max Martin on this song and his camp. I was so nervous when I went in. I wanted to put my everything into that performance because I knew that I was given the opportunity that I waited for for so many years to be able to work with somebody like him."

The ballad "Father" is the most personal song on the album. It is dedicated to Lovato's biological father who died in 2013. The song was co-written by Lovato and Swedish musician Laleh Pourkarim who also produced the song and contributed on the background vocals. Lovato said that recording the song was therapeutic in a way, and helped her reconcile her conflicting emotions. "To know that it wasn't really his fault really was saddening to me," Lovato continued. "I wanted to write about it. I wanted to process it, and 'Father' really helped me do that." Lovato and Pourkarim with Gustaf Thörn also co-wrote "Stone Cold" and "Yes". The musician Jason Evigan wrote and produced "Old Ways" with Olivia Waithe and additional production by Scott Hoffman (credited Babydaddy). "Kingdom Come" was co-written by Steve Mac, Julia Michaels and the Australian rapper Iggy Azalea who features guest appearance on the song. In an interview with MTV News, Lovato explained how her collaboration came together – and how Azalea knew exactly what to do without any idea what the song sounded like. "When we finally made the decision of which songs were making the album I said, 'OK, I want her on this one.' So I called her and was like, 'Hey will you do a song?' And she's like, 'Yeah sure I'll go into the studio tonight,'" Lovato said. "I was like, 'Do you want to hear it first?' She's like, 'No it's cool.' I'm like, 'You're an amazing friend and I love you.'" Mac also composed "Waitin for You" with Evigan, American rapper Sirah and Mitch Allan. He produced and played all keyboards in "Lionheart". "Wildfire" was written by Ryan Tedder, and Nicole Morier and the Norwegian production team Stargate who produced the track.

Music and lyrics

In terms of music, Confident departs from the bubblegum pop and synthpop predominant sound of her previous album Demi, in favour of a modern pop sound, featuring "steely, assured dance" and "shimmering electropop". Reviewing the album, Brittany Spanos from Rolling Stone described it as "a brassy, sleek, dynamic pop production that lets [Lovato's] powerful voice soar to new emotional highs." The album begins with horns that introduced the title track Confident. It features horns samples and finger snaps that back the entire track and come to the forefront during the start of the chorus. Lyrically, the song talk about self-empowerment and confidence. Nick Levine from the site NME wrote that the song "fuses hip-hop horns and Joan Jett beats and has [Lovato] bragging "it's all about me tonight". Critics noted that the song beat is reminiscent of Marilyn Manson's "Personal Jesus" (2004). The second track "Cool for the Summer" is introduced by a piano melody, followed by a buzzing synth beat, that is accompanied by guitar riffs on the chorus. Musically the song is styled in a rock edge with electronic arrangements. Lyrically, the song is about sexually experimenting with a female lover during summertime. In "Old Ways", Lovato asserts that she is glad to be rid of past habits and refuses to give in to temptation. The song uses a hip-hop arrangement in the production.

The album's fourth track is "For You", Maura Johnston of Billboard described it as a "majestic devotional". She noted the song "has a backup choir singing "For you I would do anything" as Lovato sings about summoning strength, her performance making her inner power even more plain." The album first ballad, "Stone Cold" discusses the pain of watching an ex move on and be happy with someone else. The song incorporates pop and soul influences, and is centered on a piano melody, with a stripped down production aimed at highlighting Lovato's vocals. "Stone Cold" received comparisons to Lovato's 2011 song "Skyscraper" and the work of English singer Adele. The album follow with the trap-pop song "Kingdom Come" it features vocal appearance by rapper Iggy Azalea. Several critics noted that the song is comparable to Azalea's "Black Widow" (2014), featuring Rita Ora. "Waitin for You" featuring vocals by singer Sirah, musically, it's an R&B and hip hop song that starts with a "dark and atmospheric opening" and is characteristic for having "a massive beat increase which appears to result in a impending crescendo but then results in a beat-drop". "Wildfire" is a soul-pop song. In the song, Lovato sings with synths and snaps floating around her voice. "Yes" was described as a sultry R&B song while in "Father" Lovato uses a higher vocal register, which "maximizes her emotional impact". The stripped down gospel song "Father" is dedicated for Lovato's biological father who died in 2013. It is the most personal song on the album. The Sleigh Bells-sampling twelfth track "Stars" is an uptempo pop song with a "killer chorus", while the last track of Confidents deluxe edition "Mr. Hughes" is a "retro-R&B" song.

Release
Confident was the singer's first album to be released in part under the then newly formed Safehouse Records, a partnership between Lovato, and her former manager Phil McIntyre, and Nick Jonas, as a joint venture with Island Records. Lovato stated: "I've worked closely with both Nick and Phil for years and we share the same point of view when it comes to making music. It's incredibly exciting to be part of this new company where I'm in control of all aspects of my career."

Promotion

On September 29, 2015, Lovato sent her fans on a scavenger hunt. Lovato announced that she was hiding special boxes, each on a different location. Each box contained a preview of a song from the album. The first two boxes were found that same day in New York City, the first box contained a snippet of "Stone Cold" while the second contained a snippet of "Old Ways". Lovato performed "Stone Cold" in its entirety later that same day at the Highland Ballroom in New York. On October 17, 2015, Lovato performed a "Cool for the Summer" and "Confident" medley, and "Stone Cold" on Saturday Night Live during the series' forty-first season. On October 22, 2015, Lovato released the music video for the R&B-infused "Waitin for You" featuring Sirah.

Lovato and Nick Jonas announced that they would go on a co-headlining tour, the Future Now Tour, on the Elvis Duran and the Morning Show on October 26, 2015.

Lovato performed on the second edition of the Victoria's Secret Swim Special, which aired on March 9, 2016.

Singles

"Cool for the Summer" reached international success, it was serviced as the lead single from the record on July 1, 2015, it debuted at number 36 on the Billboard Hot 100 in its first week dated July 18, 2015, selling 80,000 copies in. It entered the Hot 100's top 20 on the chart dated August 15, 2015 and peaked at number 11. It has since been certified double platinum in the US by the RIAA. The song went top 10 in the UK, New Zealand, Scotland, the Czech Republic, Mexico and Lebanon and top 20 in Canada, Ireland, Australia and Spain.

The title track, "Confident", was released as the second single on September 18, 2015, with the album's pre-order and eventually peaked at number 21 in the US. The song peaked number 1 on US Hot Dance/Club Songs. The music video for "Confident" was released on October 9, 2015, through Lovato's Vevo channel. It went top 20 in the Czech Republic as well as top 30 in Canada, Scotland, New Zealand and Slovakia. The track was certified triple platinum in the United States.

"Stone Cold" was released as the only promotional single from the album on October 9, 2015. On March 21, 2016, the song was released as the third and final single and peaked at number two on the Bubbling Under the Hot 100. It was later certified gold in the United States. The music video for the song was released on February 23, 2016.

Critical reception

Upon its release, Confident received generally favorable reviews from music critics. Awarding the album four stars at AllMusic, Stephen Thomas Erlewine writing, "the cumulative result is a messy, colorful modern pop record that is greater than the sum of its parts." Annie Zaleski from The A.V. Club gave the album a B+, saying, "Confident is an impressive album by a pop star who knows what she wants—and also knows exactly how to get there." The Guardian gave a mixed review of the album, saying, "Only a certain sheen that turns her vocals into a generic hybrid of Sia and Kelly Clarkson stops Confident from being one of the pop albums of 2015." Mike Wass from Idolator gave a mixed review, saying, "There's no right or wrong approach, but if you're going to relaunch as an irreverent pop siren like Teenage Dream-era Katy Perry, you better have an album full of surefire hits to back it up. And Confident is lacking in that department." Nick Levine gave the album 3 out of 5 stars, saying, "It's powerful stuff, especially from a singer who has bravely spoken out about her past struggles with depression, drug and alcohol abuse and an eating disorder, but ultimately Confident feels a bit relentless."

Glenn Gamboa from Newsday gave a more positive review, saying, "On Confident, Lovato's swaggering search for self is remarkably revealing, as she tackles everything from sexual experimentation to mental health issues to her relationship with her estranged father." Writing for Billboard, Maura Johnston gave the album 4.5 out of 5 stars, saying, "[Lovato's] willingness to own every step and misstep, and to show her audience how the rough times helped her become the woman she is, makes Confident a surprisingly compelling listen." Tim Stack from Entertainment Weekly gave the album a B+, saying, "Over 11 tracks Lovato's energy is unwavering, sometimes to a fault. So it's a welcome relief that she takes a moment to reveal a softer side on the gospel-tinged ballad "Father," a tear-jerking tribute to her estranged late dad." Richard Godwin from the Evening Standard gave the album a negative review, saying, "[Lovato's] more at home on the ballads such as Lionheart, while Kingdom Come, an atmospheric prowl featuring Iggy Azalea, all moody changes and trap beats, is a welcome respite from a personality record weirdly lacking in personality." Patrick Ryan from USA Today gave the album 2.5 out of 4 stars, saying, "Confident is overall an assured step forward for Lovato, who should only hone her sound and style by the time album No. 6 rolls around."

Year-end lists

Accolades

Commercial performance
Confident debuted at number two on the US Billboard 200, with first-week sales of 98,000 units (77,000 in pure album sales), behind Pentatonix's self-titled album. It has since sold over 1,000,000 copies in the country, and was certified Platinum by the Recording Industry Association of America (RIAA). In the United Kingdom, the album opened at number six on the UK Albums Chart, becoming Lovato's highest-charting album there at the time.

Track listing

Notes
 signifies an additional producer
 signifies a vocal producer 
 signifies an assistant producer
 signifies a remixer

Personnel
Credits adapted from the liner notes of the deluxe edition of Confident.

Performers and musicians

Demi Lovato – lead vocals, background vocals, piano (tracks 5, 11), keys (track 10)
Iggy Azalea – vocals (track 6)
Sirah – vocals (track 7)
Erik Arvinder – strings (track 11)
Babydaddy – keys (track 3)
David Bukovinszky – cello (tracks 4, 13)
Mattias Bylund – strings (track 4)
Johan Carlsson – background vocals (tracks 4, 13), keys (tracks 4, 13), guitar (tracks 4, 13), percussion (track 4), bass (track 13)
Peter Carlsson – live drums (track 1)
Jason Evigan – keys (track 3), all instrumentation (track 7)
Carl Falk – background vocals (track 12)
Colette Falla – background vocals (track 4)
Staffan Findin – trombone (track 1)
Kristoffer Fogelmark – background vocals (track 12)
Livvi Franc – additional background vocals (track 3)
 Paul Gendler – guitar (track 9)
Rickard Göransson – percussion (track 1)
Oscar Holter – background vocals (track 1)
Mattias Johansson – violin (tracks 4, 13)
Savan Kotecha – background vocals (tracks 1, 2)
Chris Laws – drums (tracks 6, 9)
Steve Mac – all keyboards (tracks 6, 9), all instrumentation (track 7)
Max Martin – keys (track 1), percussion (track 1)
Eru Matsumoto – cello (track 5)
Albin Nedler – background vocals (track 12)
Karl Olandersson – trumpets (track 1)
Ali Payami – guitar (track 2), drums (track 2), percussion (track 2)
Stefan Persson – trumpets (track 1)
Laleh Pourkarim – background vocals (tracks 5, 10, 11), piano (track 5), bass (tracks 5, 11), synth (tracks 5, 10, 11), percussion (track 11), organ (track 11), guitar (track 11)
Ilya Salmanzadeh – background vocals (track 1), guitar (track 1), bass (track 1), keys (track 1), percussion (track 1), drums (track 13)
Stargate – all instruments (track 8)
Ryan Tedder – background vocals (track 8)
Jonas Thander – saxophone (track 1)
Gustaf Thörn – background vocals (tracks 5, 10, 11), piano (tracks 5, 11), synth (tracks 5, 11), keys (track 10), organ (tracks 10, 11), bass (track 10)
Ina Wroldsen – background vocals (track 9)
Rami Yacoub – background vocals (track 12)

Production

Mitch Allan – vocal production (tracks 3, 7, 8)
Babydaddy – additional production (track 3)
Spencer Bastian – additional programming (track 3)
Cory Bice – engineering (track 13)
Mattias Bylund – strings arrangement (tracks 4, 13)
Johan Carlsson – music production (tracks 4, 13), vocal production (tracks 4, 13), drums programming (track 13)
Peter Carlsson – vocal production (tracks 4, 13)
Tom Coyne – mastering
Jason Evigan – music production (tracks 3, 7)
Carl Falk – music production (track 12), programming (track 12)
Serban Ghenea – mixing (tracks 1-7, 9-13)
Sam Holland – engineering (tracks 1, 2, 4, 13)
Chris Laws – engineering (tracks 6, 9), additional engineering (track 7)
Steve Mac – music production (tracks 6, 7, 9)
Mag – FX programming (track 10), drum programming (track 10)
Max Martin – music production (tracks 1, 2), programming (track 1), additional programming (track 2)
Randy Merrill – assistant mastering
Noah "Mailbox" Passovoy – engineering (track 4)
Ali Payami – music production (tracks 2, 4), programming (track 2)
Laleh Pourkarim – music production (tracks 5, 10, 11), vocal production (track 10), cello arrangement (track 5), engineering (tracks 5, 10, 11), drum programming (tracks 5, 10, 11), FX programming (track 10), synth programming (track 11)
Dann Pursey – engineering (tracks 6, 9)
Daniela Rivera – additional engineering (track 8), assistant engineering (track 8)
Ilya Salmanzadeh – music production (tracks 1, 13), programming (track 1), drums programming (track 13)
Stargate – music production (track 8)
Phil Tan – mixing (track 8)
Isaiah Tejada – additional programming (track 3)
Jonas Thander – horn arrangement (track 1)
Gustaf Thörn – assistant production (track 10), assistant engineering (tracks 5, 10, 11), string arrangement (track 5), synth programming (track 11)
Rami Yacoub – music production (track 12), programming (track 12)

Design
Sandy Brummels – creative direction
Jessica Kelly – additional packaging design
Todd Russell – art direction and design
Yu Tsai – photography

Charts

Weekly charts

Year-end charts

Certifications

Release history

See also
 List of number-one albums of 2015 (Canada)

References

2015 albums
Demi Lovato albums
Hollywood Records albums
Island Records albums
Safehouse Records albums
Albums produced by Ilya Salmanzadeh
Albums produced by Jason Evigan
Albums produced by Max Martin
Albums produced by Stargate
Albums produced by Steve Mac
Albums recorded at Westlake Recording Studios
Albums produced by Johan Carlsson